The 1970 Miami Redskins football team was an American football team that represented Miami University in the Mid-American Conference (MAC) during the 1970 NCAA University Division football season. In their second season under head coach Bill Mallory, Miami compiled a 7–3 record (3–2 against MAC opponents), finished in a tie for second place in the MAC, and outscored all opponents by a combined total of 187 to 112. The team's defense allowed only 11.2 points per game, which ranked 10th among 123 NCAA University Division football teams.

The team's statistical leaders included Jim Bengala with 1,265 passing yards, Tim Fortney with 1,063 rushing yards, and Mike Palija with 659 receiving yards.

Defensive back Dick Adams won the Miami most valuable player award. Adams was also selected as a second-team All-American by the Associated Press. Adams and Jim Bengala were the team captains.

Schedule

References

Miami
Miami RedHawks football seasons
Miami Redskins football